Mokoswane is a village in Central District of Botswana. The village is located 30 km south-east of Mahalapye, and it has a primary school. In a 2001 census, the village's population was 362.

References

Populated places in Central District (Botswana)
Villages in Botswana